The National Parks Project is a Canadian music and film project. Released in 2011 to mark the 100th anniversary of the creation of the National Parks of Canada system, the project sent teams consisting of three Canadian musicians and a filmmaker to 13 Canadian national parks, one in each province or territory, to shoot and score a short documentary film about the park.

The project was commissioned by Parks Canada and produced by FilmCAN and Primitive Entertainment, in association with Discovery World HD. Prior to its commissioning, a test film by Ryan Noth, Joel McConvey and Geoff Morrison entitled National Parks Project: Gros Morne was released in 2009; although it was not included in the finished series, Noth, McConvey and Morrison were producers of the series.

In addition to airing on Discovery World and on the web, the series was also screened at a number of film festivals, including Toronto's Hot Docs.

Music from the project was released on several EPs, as well as on a compilation album that featured some of the most popular tracks.

Awards
Zacharias Kunuk's segment, Sirmilik, won the Genie Award for Best Short Documentary Film at the 32nd Genie Awards. The overall series won the Gemini Award for Best Performing Arts Program or Series at the 26th Gemini Awards.

Projects

References

External links
National Parks Project

Compilation albums by Canadian artists
2011 albums
Canadian documentary films
2011 films
English-language Canadian films
Documentary film series
National Parks of Canada
Documentary films about nature
Documentary web series
Canadian non-fiction web series
Canadian Screen Award-winning television shows
Canadian film series
2010s Canadian films